This is a discography for the band Ruby.

Studio albums

Salt Peter

 released November 1, 1995; produced by Mark Walk, Lesley Rankine
 released on WORK/Creation labels
 recorded at Mommy's Cunt, Butler, Soundhouse Studios, Seattle, WA, USA - June '94 to Jan '95

The original version of "Carondelet" was titled "Chikasaw" and appeared on the 1994 Pigface album Notes from Thee Underground.

Short-Staffed at the Gene Pool

 released April 24, 2001; produced by Walk, Rankine
 released on Thirsty Ear/Wichita labels

Revert to Type (EP)

released July 9, 2013

Waiting for Light

 released August 1, 2014; produced by Scott Firth, Lesley Rankine

Type-Cast (EP) 

 released November 2016

Remix albums

Revenge, The Sweetest Fruit: Salt Peter Remixed

 released April 8, 1996 (US only); produced by Walk, Rankine
 released on Creation/WORK labels
 recorded at Mommy's Cunt, Butler, Soundhouse Studios, Seattle, WA, USA - June '94 to Jan '95

Stroking the Full Length

 released October 29, 1996 (UK only); produced by Walk, Rankine
 released on WORK/Creation labels
 recorded at Mommy's Cunt, Butler, Soundhouse Studios, Seattle, WA, USA - June '94 to Jan '95

Altered and Proud, the Short Staffed Remixes

 released July 17, 2001; produced by Walk, Rankine
 released on Thirsty Ear/Wichita labels

Singles

Salt Peter
"Paraffin"

Released November 7, 1995 - WORK/Creation labels
"Tiny Meat"

1995 - WORK/Creation labels
"Hoops"

Released January 1, 1996 WORK/Creation labels

Short-Staffed at the Gene Pool
"Grace"

Released March 20, 2001 - Wichita/Thirsty Ear labels
"Beefheart"

Released July 31, 2001 - Wichita/Thirsty Ear labels

"Lamplight"

2002 - Wichita/Thirsty Ear labels

Chart performance

Singles

Albums

References

Discographies of American artists
Rock music group discographies